Kashia East, aka Kashia poorab is a proposed town area nagar panchayat including Muratganj in Kaushambi district  in the Indian state of Uttar Pradesh.

History 

Kashiya East was earlier known as Kashiya Sadat in Pargana Chail for being one of eight villages inhabited by Naqvi Bukhari Syeds, the descendants of Syed Hussam uddin Hasan Bukhari, great-grandson of Hazrat Jalaluddin Surkh-Posh Bukhari of Ucch Bukharan (Bahawalpur) Multan province  in the Southern Punjab of Pakistan.

Public amenities 
Kashia is Kasiya (CT) where CT stands for Census Town as per India Census 2011.
Kashia East is a village in the Murat Ganj block in Chail Tehsil, near Bharwari. Amenities include two government Primary Health Clinics (PHC), one Veterinary hospital, one Primary high school and one Junior High school, Kanya Pathsala.

Hamlets 

Kashia East comprises many hamlets, including Shergarh, ChikwanPura, Nadirganj and Bazar ka Bagh.

Demographics 

 Indian census, Kashiya East had a population of about ten thousand. Males constitute 53% of the population and females 47%. Kashiya East has an average literacy rate of 50%, lower than the national average of 59.5%; with male literacy of 51% and female literacy of 30%. 19% of the population is under 6 years of age.

References 

Cities and towns in Kaushambi district